is a city located in Chiba Prefecture, Japan. , the city had an estimated population of 131,714 in 59,895 households and a population density of 3000 persons per km².

Geography
Abiko is located in the northwestern part of Chiba prefecture, about 30 kilometers from the prefectural capital of Chiba, and within 30 to 40 kilometers of central Tokyo. It is separated from Ibaraki Prefecture in the north by the Tone River. The city is located on the Shimosa Plateau, with an average elevation of about 20 meters above sea level. The city stretches about 14 kilometers east-to-west and about 4 to 6 kilometers north-to-south.

Neighboring municipalities
Chiba Prefecture
Inzai
Kashiwa
Ibaraki Prefecture
Toride
Tone

Climate
Abiko has a humid subtropical climate (Köppen Cfa) characterized by warm summers and cool winters with light to no snowfall.  The average annual temperature in Abiko is 14.7 °C. The average annual rainfall is 1345 mm with September as the wettest month. The temperatures are highest on average in August, at around 26.3 °C, and lowest in January, at around 3.8 °C.

Demographics
Per Japanese census data, the population of Abiko has recently plateaued after a long period of growth.

History
The area around Abiko has been inhabited since Japanese Paleolithic times, and archaeologists have found stone tools dated from 30,000 years ago. During the Edo period, Abiko was a river port on the Tone River and a post station on the Mito Kaidō, a highway connecting Edo with Mito. After the Meiji Restoration, Abiko Town was created in Minamisoma District, Chiba Prefecture on April 1, 1889, along with the town of Fusa and village of Kohoku with the establishment of the modern municipalities system. Abiko was transferred to Higashikatsushika District in 1897. From the Taisho period to the early Showa period, Abiko was sometimes called "Kamakura in the north" as many prominent cultural figures such as Naoya Shiga, Saneatsu Mushanokoji, Soetsu Yanagi, and Bernard Leach had villas in the town, which became a center for the Shirakabaha literary coterie. On November 1, 1954, it annexed neighboring Tomise village from the same district. On April 29, 1955, Abiko annexed Fusa Town and Kohoku Village. Abiko achieved city status on July 1, 1970. In 2003, a proposal to merge Abiko with neighboring city of Kashiwa and the town of Shōnan was defeated by a public referendum.  Parts of the city were damaged by soil liquefaction due to the 2011 Tōhoku earthquake and tsunami.

Government
Abiko has a mayor-council form of government with a directly elected mayor and a unicameral city council of 24 members. Abiko contributes two members to the Chiba Prefectural Assembly. In terms of national politics, the city is part of Chiba 8th district of the lower house of the Diet of Japan.

Economy
Although agriculture still plays a significant role in the local economy, Abiko is largely a regional commercial center and from the 1970s developed into a commuter town for nearby Chiba and Tokyo. The commuting rate is 32.3% for central Tokyo and 12.4% for Kashiwa City (both according to the 2010 census).

Education

Universities
Chuo Gakuin University
Kawamura Gakuen Women's University

Primary and secondary education
Abiko has 13 public elementary schools and six public middle schools operated by the city government, and two public high schools operated by the Chiba Prefectural Board of Education. There are also two private high schools. The prefecture also operates one special education school for the handicapped.

Transportation

Railway
 JR East –   Jōban Line
  – 
 JR East –   Narita Line
 -  -  -  -

Highway

Point of Interests
Akebonoyama Park
Abiko City Museum of Birds
Yamashina Institute for Ornithology

Notable people
Isao Aoki, professional golfer
Makoto Kaneko, professional baseball player
Hajime Meshiai, professional golfer
Seiji Ebihara, professional golfer
Muga Takewaki, actor
Asuka Tono, Takarazuka musician
Morinosuke Chiwaki,  founder of Japan Dental Association
Ryo Takeuchi, filmmaker

References

External links

 Official Website 
 Yamashina Institute for Ornithology website

 
Cities in Chiba Prefecture